Robyn Kahukiwa (born 1938) is an Australian-born New Zealand artist, award-winning children's book author, and illustrator. Kahukiwa has created a significant collection of paintings, books, prints, drawings, and sculptures.

Life
Kahukiwa was born in Sydney, New South Wales, Australia, in 1938. She trained as a commercial artist and later moved to New Zealand at the age of nineteen. Kahukiwa's early artworks were inspired by discovering her Māori heritage.

Māori on her mother's side, Kahukiwa is of Ngāti Porou, Te Aitanga-a-Hauiti, Ngāti Hau, Ngāti Konohi and Whanau-a-Ruataupare descent.

Career 
From 1972 to 1980, Kahukiwa was a regular exhibitor at the Academy in Wellington.

In the 1980s, Kahukiwa gained prominence in New Zealand after her exhibition Wāhine Toa (strong women), which toured the country. This exhibition drew on Māori myth and symbolism. One of the pieces, Hinetītama, is in the permanent collection at Te Manawa.

Kahukiwa's work often deals with themes of colonialism and the dispossession of indigenous people, motherhood and blood-ties, social custom and mythology. In a 2004 article, Kahukiwa implements "political activism in subject matter and method into powerful images that assert Māori identity and tradition."

She is a "staunch supporter of Māori rights and the power and prestige of Māori women."

Kahukiwa's works are influenced by Colin McCahon, Ralph Hotere and Frida Kahlo.

In 2011, Kahukiwa was awarded with the Te Tohu Toi Kē Award from Te Waka Toi, the Māori arm of Creative New Zealand.

Publications
 Taniwha (1986)
 Paikea (1993)
 The Koroua and the Mauri Stone (1994)
 Kēhua (1996)
 Supa Heroes: Te Wero (2000)
 Koha (2003)
 Matatuhi (2007)
 The forgotten Taniwha (2009) 
 Tutu Taniwha (2010) 
 Te Marama (2011)
 The Boy and the Dolphin (2016)
 Ngā Atua: Māori Gods (2016)

With writer Patricia Grace:
 The Kuia and the Spider (1981)
 Watercress Tuna and the Children of Champion Street (1984)
 Wāhine Toa: Women of Māori Myth (1984)

With Joy Cowley:
 Grandma’s stick (1982)
 Hatupatu and the birdwoman (1982)

With Rangimarie Sophie Jolley:
 The Blue Book (2014)

Awards
1994 LIANZA Young People's Non-Fiction Award (now known as Elsie Locke Award) for Paikea
2011 Te Tohu Toi Kē | Making a Difference Award

References

Further reading
 Eggleton, David Earth and Spirit: Robyn Kahukiwa's Mauri Ora! Exhibition Art New Zealand, 2002
 Panoho, Rangihiroa, Māori Art: History, Architecture, Landscape and Theory, Auckland: David Bateman Ltd, 2015

External links
 Works by Robyn Kahukiwa in the collection of the Museum of New Zealand Te Papa Tongarewa
Robyn Kahukiwa: Artist, Writer, Illustrator The Sapling, 2017
Hinetitama by Robyn Kahukiwa NZ History

1938 births
Year of birth uncertain
Living people
New Zealand women artists
New Zealand Māori artists
Ngāti Porou people
Te Aitanga-a-Hauiti people
Ngāti Hau people
Writers from Sydney
Artists from Sydney
New Zealand Māori writers
New Zealand Māori women
New Zealand children's book illustrators
New Zealand children's writers
New Zealand women children's writers